The 1997 CART PPG World Series season, the nineteenth in the CART era of U.S. open-wheel racing, consisted of 17 races,  beginning in Homestead, Florida on March 2 and concluding in Fontana, California on September 28.  The PPG CART World Series Drivers' Champion was Alex Zanardi.  Rookie of the Year was Patrick Carpentier.

After a settlement with the Indianapolis Motor Speedway, CART relinquished its license of the "IndyCar" trademark for 1997 and beyond. As a result, the series was renamed for the first time since 1980. The CART term, which had been mostly eschewed since 1992, was brought back and embraced, a new logo was unveiled, and participants were encouraged to refer to the machines of the CART series as "Champ Cars". The revival of the historic term (and curtailing the use of the mostly generic term "Indy cars") helped to differentiate the machines from those of the rival Indy Racing League, and was part of a concerted and necessary effort to distance the series from the Indianapolis 500, to which it no longer had any link. This was also the last year of title sponsorship by PPG Industries, although the Driver's Championship continued to be known as the PPG Cup until 1999.

This is the first season since 1983 not to featuring Emerson Fittipaldi.

Drivers and constructors 
The following teams and drivers competed in the 1997 CART World Series season.

Season summary

Schedule

– The Australian Indy Grand Prix was supposed to run 182 miles, but was shortened due to time constraints.
– Portland was supposed to be 193 miles, but was shortened due to rain.
 Oval/Speedway
 Dedicated road course
 Temporary street circuit

Race results 

(R) Dedicated road course, (O) Oval/Speedway, (S) Temporary street circuit

Final driver standings

Nation's Cup 

 Top result per race counts towards Nation's Cup.

Chassis Constructor's Cup

Engine Manufacturer's Cup

See also
 1997 Toyota Atlantic Championship season
 1997 Indianapolis 500
 1996–97 Indy Racing League
 1997 Indy Lights season
 Super Speedway
 CART World Series

References

 
 
 
 

Champ Car seasons
CART
CART
 
CART